The Pakistan Cup is the national domestic List A cricket competition in Pakistan. Played originally as the Pentangular One Day Cup in 2008–09, 2009–10 and 2014–15, the competition was renamed as the Pakistan Cup in 2016 when it also adopted a draft to select squads for the five provincial teams. Following a national restructuring of domestic cricket by the Pakistan Cricket Board in 2019, the tournament has been contested by the six regional teams, although the first edition under the new structure, in 2019–20, was not held due to the COVID-19 pandemic.

Prior to 2019–20, the premier List A domestic competition in Pakistan was the National One-Day Cup which was contested by associations or departments, or a combination of the two.

Format
Each team plays one another (twice since 2019–20) in a round-robin group stage. Historically, the top two teams in the league play a final. Since 2019–20, the top four teams contest in a semi-final followed by a final.

Teams

Current teams
Details of each team are set out below.

Team Results

 Notes
 W = Winner; 
 R = Runner-up;
 (x) = End of league games table position;

Former teams
 Baluchistan Bears (later Baluchistan Warriors)
 Federal Leopards (later Federal United)
 North-West Frontier Province Panthers (later Khyber Pakhtunkhwa Fighters)
 Punjab Stallions (later Punjab Badshahs)
 Sind Dolphins (later Sind Knights)

Winners and competition details

See also

 Quaid-e-Azam Trophy
 National T20 Cup
 Pakistan Super League
 Kashmir Premier League (Pakistan)

References

 
Pakistani domestic cricket competitions
List A cricket competitions